Samea purpurascens is a moth in the family Crambidae. It is found in India (Andamans).

References

Moths described in 1877
Spilomelinae